Regina City was a federal electoral district in Saskatchewan, Canada, that was represented in the House of Commons of Canada from 1935 to 1968.

This riding was created in 1933 from parts of Regina riding.

It consisted initially of the city of Regina.

In 1952, it was redefined to consist of a part of the city of Regina bounded by a line drawn from the intersection of Campbell Street and the right-of-way of the Canadian National Railway east along the right-of-way and McKinley Avenue, south along Park Street, west along Twenty-fifth Avenue, north along Campbell Street to the right-of-way of the Canadian Pacific Railway, northwest following the western limit of the property of the Royal Canadian Mounted Police, east along Dewdney Avenue, and north along Campbell Street to the CNR. It also included a rural area outside of the city north of Wascana Creek.

It was abolished in 1966 when it was redistributed into Regina East and Regina—Lake Centre ridings.

Election results

|National Credit Control
|John Bernard Ball
|align=right|122

See also
 List of Canadian federal electoral districts
 Past Canadian electoral districts

External links
 

Former federal electoral districts of Saskatchewan